Basque rural sports, known as Deportes Rurales in Spanish or Herri Kirolak in Basque, is the term used for a number of sports competitions rooted in the traditional lifestyles of the Basque people. The term force basque is used in French.

The sociological changes in the Basque Country have led many of these becoming technically obsolete in the 19th and 20th century. Few continue to exist as rural or marine activities connected to everyday life and have become rare but many have managed to transform themselves into popular sports instead, some of which have become extremely popular.

Winners receive a Basque beret ( or ) as a trophy, hence the Basque word for "champion" - , literally "one who has a beret".

Betting, both by the competitors and the audience, is very common and popular at such sporting events in the north of Spain.

The H18K rural sports

In 2006 the Basque Government identified 18 particular rural sports, called H18K, in its Strategic Plan for promotion. These 18 categories are (in alphabetical order):

Aizkora proba (wood chopping)

This is a very popular sport today but its origins are to be found in the rural wood cutting and charcoal burning communities of earlier periods.

In this competition, the wood cutter has to chop through a number of tree trunks arranged on the ground in rows as quickly as possible while standing on the log to beat his competitors.

This sport is often seen in summer at local festivities and open-air dances, held in towns all over the country.

Giza-abere probak (dragging games)

This sport translates as Human-animal tests and is a collective term for a number of sports in which humans and animals are involved in dragging heavy weights. There are four main categories:
 (human tests) where people attempt to drag a heavy weight, usually a large rock, across a certain distance
 (horse tests) - same as giza probak but with horses
 (oxen tests) - same as giza probak but with oxen
 (donkey tests) - same as giza probak but with donkeys
These normally take place on specially built trial grounds. The aim is to cover a certain distance within a given time or to cover as many circuits as possible. The idi probak are by far the most popular in this category.

Harri jasotzea (stone lifting)

There are usually two stone-lifters competing in each event, taking turns in one or several attempts, to perform the greatest possible number of lifts. A lift is considered complete when the stone has been properly balanced on the shoulder.

The four types of stone most frequently used are rectangular, cylindrical, spherical and square and were established at the beginning of the 20th century. The stones are traditionally made of granite, their weight normally ranging from 100 kg to 212 kg.

Together with aizkolaritza (wood chopping), stone lifting is another example a widely performed rural sport at local festivities all over the Basque Country.

Harri zulaketa (hole drilling)

The hole drilling competition involves having to grind holes into a rock. Teams of three compete against each other. They take turns in using a long metal pole (called ) to punch and drill a hole into a large rock upon which they are standing, pouring water onto the working area while the third person gets to rest.

This tradition goes back to the quarrying activities around the Basque Country, in particular in Biscay. In Spanish it is called  "drillers" and occasionally  (drillers, from the Spanish word) in Basque as well.

Ingude altxatzea (anvil lifting)

The lifting of anvils requires competitors to lift an iron anvil or ingude weighing 18 kg 30 cm above the height of their own head as many times as possible in a set time period. The anvil has the shape of an obtuse triangle with a stump at one point or an elongated T and is traditionally used in shoeing horses. Champions manage some 80 lifts in 2 minutes.

In Spanish this is called  and in French .

Lasto altxatzea (bale lifting)

Literally hay bale lifting, this sport involves raising a hay-bale with the aid of a pulley.

The competition is usually about lifting the bale as often as possible within a given period of time, most commonly 2 minutes.  The bale weighs 45 kg in the men's competitions and 30 kg in the women's competition.

The most difficult part is to get the bale to the required height for the first time. Once that has been achieved, the competitors allow the bale to drop in free fall, grabbing the rope and jumping up at the appropriate moment to use their own body weight to lift the bale again when coming down. A lot of skill is needed to avoid rope burn. The visual appearance is not dissimilar to swinging on a church bell rope.

In Spanish this is called  and in French .

Lasto botatzea (bale tossing)

Here the hay-bales have to be thrown over a bar set a certain height with the help of a pitchfork. For men the height is normally 7 m, for women 5 m and the bale has to hit a bell for the toss to be valid.

This sport is very similar to the Scottish sheaf toss. In Spanish this is called .

Lokotx biltzea (cob gathering)
In cob gathering competitions, also called , cobs are placed at 1.25m distances in a line, 25 in a line at the most. The game can be played to 50, 75 or 100 cobs in which case they are placed in sets of 2, 3 or 4. The competitors have to collect these in order (the nearest first) and place them into a basket at one end of the row of cobs.

Ontzi eramatea (churn carrying)
The churn carrying competition usually involves milk-cans and is very similar to the  competition. Competitors have to carry a 41 kg milk-churn in each hand as far as possible. This game is also called  "milk carrying" or  "can carrying".

Orga jokoa (cart game)

The "oxcart game" is a display of strength. Contestants have to lift the back of an ox cart weighing 360 kg 40 cm above ground. The cart is pivoted to the ground at the front end and competitors must rotate it, trying to go around as many times as possible.

It is also called  in Basque. In Spanish this is called  and in French .

Sega jokoa (scything)
The earliest record of this sport comes from a bertso dating back to 1880 about a competition in Iturriotz.

In this sport competitors (called ) either compete to cut the most grass in a given period of time (usually one hour) or they are each given plots of grass of the same size and the competition is to see who can scythe theirs the fastest. Today the competition usually lasts one hour but two-hour competitions also are still held. At the end, the grass is raked, weighed and baled to establish the winner. Traditionally, as with most Basque sports, the competitors would make a profit by betting but monetary prizes have been put up since the 1950s.

There are few actual records in this sport as it very much depends on the terrain and is thus difficult to compare. But a number of  have achieved fame nonetheless, for example the legendary Pedro Maria Otaño Ezeitza, commonly known as Santa Ageda from Beizama who was also an aizkolari and competed up until 1915. Another famed event was the competition of 1925 in Iturriotz when, before a crowd of 6000, Pedro Mendizabal from Aia and Jose Arrieta from Urnieta battled each other. Legend has it that more than 150,000 pesetas in bets were placed. Mendizabal won, cutting 4294 kg of grass in two hours against his rival's 3957 kg.

The use of scythes is still widespread today as many pastures are too steep for modern farm machinery so scythes are used to cut grass or bracken. Working scythes have blades between 0.9-0.95m long but competition scythes range from 1.18-1.24m in length. A decent  can manage some 5000 m2 in a day.

In Spanish this is simply called .

Sokatira (tug-of-war)
Tug-of-war is also traditional in the Basque Country. Usually two teams of eight compete, trying to drag the other team over a line by pulling on the rope.

There are free competitions in which the weight of the competitors is ignored and more structured events where there are weight categories of 525 kg, 560 kg, 640 kg and 720 kg per team. Juvenile teams are always under 560 kg. Three lines are marked on the ground, a middle line and parallel to that at 2m distance two more. The maximum length of the rope is 32m with a circumference between 10-12.5 cm. There are 5 markers on the rope, a red marker in the middle, 2m away from the red marker on either side are white markers and 5m on either side of those are blue markers. The aim is for a team to get the opposing team's blue marker over the team's own 2m line. Hands must always be on the rope and it may not be supported with any other part of the body or allowed to slacken. Only the last member of the team is allowed to wind the rope around their body.

In Spanish this is called  and in French .

Trontza (sawing)
The log is either fixed horizontally on sawhorses at a height of 40 cm or at an angle with one end over the sawhorse and two members of the sawing team sitting on the lower end to stabilise the log, with two other handling the saw. The saw is usually 2 m long, the logs vary but can be over 1 m in circumference and usually between 10-20 in number.

In Spanish this is called  or just  and in French .

Txinga eramatea (weight carrying)

In the weight carrying competition weights have to be carried in both hands as far as possible. There usually is no time limit but the weights weigh between 50–100 kg each and may not be put down or supported by any other part of the body. Competitors may hold them only  by the rope handles and are not allowed to put their hands through the handles. It is possible for competitors to bring their own, favourite weights, but they are checked by judges beforehand. The aim is to complete as many plaza of 28m as possible. Competitors each set their own pace and may stop (without putting the weights down). Champions typically manage 400–50 0m.
It is similar to the churn carrying competition.

Zaku eramatea (sack carrying)
The sack carrying, also called  (sack race) requires participants to have both speed and stamina. It usually takes the form of a relay race in teams of 3 where the runners have to carry heavy sacks across their shoulders. Depending on the area, the sacks contain a variety of things from bread to beans and usually weigh 60 kg, 75 kg or 80 kg.

Other rural sports
The above categories included in the H18K group aside, there are a number of other rural and traditional Basque sports, some of which are extremely popular both in and outside the Basque Country. Some are indigenous, some also occur in areas adjacent to the Basque country or other cultures around the world.

Ahari topeka (ram fighting)

Ram fights, also variously called  (ram bets) and ahari talka (ram bump) are very popular around the Urola basin in towns like Azpeitia (between October and June) and Arroa. They test the strength and endurance of the rams, using their natural inclination to fight other rams.

The rams are trained and fed on a variety of secret diets involving things like beans, apples, red wine, carrots or egg yolk. A basic fight goes over at least 8 ekintaldi (attacks), also called kintze (from Spanish quince "15"), with the best of 8 winning. To score a point, a ram has to land a square hit on his opponent's head or horns. If the ram runs away at the start, the owner is allowed to bring him back into the ring once. There are records of bets over 100 attacks but these are rare now.

Although the strongest rams are said to come from the Aralar Mendilerroa mountain range between Gipuzkoa and Navarre, they are also said to be too placid so the preference is for rams from the region around Urbasa, Andia and Gorbeia.

The Basque Government controversially banned the Iurreta  in 2007 on animal welfare grounds.

This sport is called  in Spanish.

Aitzur jaurtiketa (hoe throwing)
A game of throwing hoes.

Antzar jokoa (goose game)

There are two variations of this game depending on whether it is played at a seaside town or inland. In a seaside town, a long rope is suspended between a pole on the quay and the mast of a boat. A dead goose (previously live geese were used too) is suspended head down in the middle of the rope. Teams now have to row out and a designated person must jump up, grab the goose, hang on to it and try to remove the head before falling off. At the same time, sailors at both ends of the rope try their best to shake the person clinging to the goose off. The team that collects the most heads wins. Inland, the rope is suspended over the ground and the same goal must be achieved from horseback.

It has also been celebrated on other days in other villages, sometimes (for example in Gernika) using chicken instead of geese.

In Spanish this is called juego de gansos and in French as jeu d'oie.

Ardi ile moztea (sheep shearing)
Sheep shearing also features in Basque rural sports and works along similar lines as other sheep shearing contests.  translates as "the shearing of sheep's wool" and it is also known as  "sheep shearing".

Asto arineketan (donkey races)
Similar to horse racing but with donkeys.

Blankolari (shooting)
Shotgun shooting is particularly popular in the area around Eibar in the Basque Country.

In Spanish this is called puntería con escopeta, in French as compétition avec escopette.

Bola jokoa (bowls)

Basques have also their own variants of dirt-track and lawn bowls. There is a large number of variations of the game but most are similar to skittles and centre around a set of pins that must be knocked down with a ball.

Espadrila jaurtiketa (espadrilles tossing)
A game of throwing espadrilles, a kind of shoe with a straw sole.

Estropadak (rowing competitions)

A very popular rowing competition all along the coast of the Bay of Biscay and the Northern coast of the Iberian Peninsula.

This sport hails back to the days when fishermen had to reach fishing grounds quickly and return to port as quickly as possible to achieve the best price.

The crew is made up of thirteen oarsmen and the cox, who faces them at the stern. The boats are called  ( in Spanish), and are derived from 19th century fishing boats.

The most important competition in the Bay of Biscay in summer takes place the first two Sundays in September: the Kontxako Bandera, where the best teams compete against each other, following a tradition which is over a hundred years old. There is a regatta in almost every seaside town between July and October.

Goitibeherak (soapbox cars)
In the Basque Country the tradition of building soapbox cars goes back at least to the early 20th century.

The earliest documented races date back to the mid-1970s, when races were held during local festivals. The first Basque national competition was held in 1976, and they are common events all over the Basque Country today. One of the biggest events, the Goitibehera Munduko Txapelketa (World Goitibehera Championship) was first held in 1985 in Pamplona during the San Fermínes and has been held at irregular intervals since, the last time on 28 June 2008 when the IX World Championship was held.

The normal soapbox races are called  in Spanish but this version is called  even in Spanish. They occur in the Basque Country and Uruguay to where they were exported by Basque emigrants.

Igel jokoa (frog game)

The frog game is a pub game played both in the Basque Country and outside. In the Basque Country, it is commonly played in Basque sagardotegiak (cider houses) and taverns. The aim of the game is to score as many points as possible by throwing ten metal discs at a chest.

The chest can be placed at a range of distances away from the players, usually 8–15 paces. On top of the chest, there is an iron frog with an open mouth, a mill, and a bridge. Underneath are more empty compartments. In most variants, a player who manages to hit the frog's mouth is awarded 50 points; 25 points are awarded for getting the disc under the mill, 10 for the bridge, and 5 for any of the compartments below. Other scoring systems also exist.

Some frog chests have obstacles built into the frog, mill, and bridge to make the game more difficult. Discs that have hit any mark are collected at the back of the chest via a set of metal tubes.

In Spanish, this game is called  in Spain and Chile,  in Peru and Argentina,  in Bolivia, and just  in Colombia. In England, it is known as toad in the hole.

Korrika (racing)
Also a popular sport in the Basque country. There are broadly speaking two categories:
races held in bullrings where a circle with a 15m radius. Competitors try to complete a set number of laps as fast as possible.
cross country races, usually of more than 10 km.

A highly popular race, the Korrika, is held once a year in aid of Basque schools and crosses all parts of the Basque Country.
The goal is not competition, but the raising of funds and awareness.

The traditional forms of running  have been largely supplanted by modern forms of running and racing.

Kukaina (yard climbing)

This variant of the Neapolitan greasy pole game is usually played on a yard that is suspended horizontally over water. A piece of cloth is attached to the far end of the yard and competitors have to try to reach it and retrieve it.
A variant uses a greased vertical pole.
It can also be spelled , a word which derives from the Spanish word  (Cockaigne), in French .

Laiariak (laia competitions)

This is a competition involving the laia, a farming implement that resembles a two-pronged heavy pitchfork with an off-centre handle, either with a long or short handle. Traditionally four or five members of either gender of a baserri family are picked to compete as a team, the task being to turn over a plot of land as quickly as possible.

The  was a very widespread instrument used to loosen soil. With the advent of modern farming machinery, its use is now restricted to area machines cannot reach, for example on high slopes, and kitchen gardens.

Makil tira (stick pulling)
In this game, two players sit on the ground with their feet touching, separated by a plank. Both players also hold onto a makila, and the aim is to lift one's opponent to their feet.

Oilar jokoa (chicken game)
This term in Basque covers two sorts of chicken games: 
cockfighting, which was outlawed in 1926.
a game where a chicken is buried to the neck and blindfolded. Competitors, themselves blindfolded too, have to locate the chicken guided by the music of a txistulari or drummer. In the old days the goal was to remove the head from the chicken once it was located but when played today, it is sufficient to touch the head. The most famous  is held in Legazpi in June today but the game used to be more widespread.

Palanka jaurtiketa (metal bar throwing)
The throwing of a metal bar was once one of the most popular and widespread of Basque sports. Its popularity waned during the 19th century. Having died out in most areas, it survived the longest in parts of Gipuzkoa until its ultimate demise in the 20th century.

Some techniques by name are:
 "with half a turn"
 "from the chest"
 "from between the legs"

As a pastime, the miners would see who could throw the heavy tool the furthest in their breaks.

Curiously, the Spanish athlete Miguel de la Quadra-Salcedo used a javelin throwing technique based on the Basque techniques of throwing the palanka at the 1960 Summer Olympics in Rome. Initially breaking the world record in javelin throwing, his record was later annulled when the IAAF amended its rules to exclude techniques that at any point in time involve the athlete or the javelin face or point towards the audience.

(pitcher race)

It is a traditional ceramic pitcher that resembles a fat teapot, with a diameter at the base of around 20 cm, a lid on the top with about 10 cm diameter and about 30 cm tall and a fairly large spout. It can either be glazed or unglazed, with one or three handles (if it was designed to be hung) that was traditionally used to carry water.

In Spanish this is called  and in French .

Esku Pilota (Basque pelota)

The Basque sport best known outside the Basque Country is Basque pelota. It is a Basque version of the family of ball games that covers squash, tennis, and real tennis, all of them thought to derive from the Jeu de paume and hence a relative of Valencian pilota.

But the main innovation of Basque pilota is that players share a common playground and throw the ball to a wall, making it an indirect game, while the other games in this family are generally direct games where the players face each other in two separate fields separated by a net or line on the ground. The Basques began playing pelota indirectly during the middle of the 19th century. For the different variations of Basque pelota, see the main article on Basque pelota.

While most of the best world players are Basque (in either the Spanish or the French federations), it is by no means limited to the Basque Country and is also played in Castile, Rioja and places where Basques have emigrated to such as Mexico (home of frontenis), Florida and the Philippines.

As such it has been an Olympic exhibition sport in Paris, Mexico and Barcelona.

Pulsolariak (arm wrestling)
Basque arm wrestling follows broadly the same rules as anywhere else.

Recortes

Soka-muturra (bull-herding)

The name of this sport literally translates as "snout rope" ( "rope" and  "snout").
It derives from a tradition where cattle destined for slaughter were led through the town on long ropes regularly on a particular day of the week (which varies from town to town). Occasionally a bull would break free on run wild, an event called  (to make a run), while the crowds made sport of the bulls. From the 14th century onwards bulls were increasingly let loose on purpose, ultimately leading to the tradition of running the bulls.

Today this is sometimes also practised in bullrings, either temporary or permanent, using calves rather.
If fully grown bulls are used it is as a prelude for a bullfight, which is a regular feature of the Running of the Bulls in Iruñea/Pamplona.

Toka

This is game involves throwing small objects like pebbles, balls or coins across a distance, trying to hit the target, a vertical metal pole.

Txakur probak (sheepdog trials)
Sheepdog trials are another lively example of the Basque traditional pastoral lifestyle. They're also called  or "shepherd dogs skill competitions".

Sheepdog trials in the Basque Country are very similar to those held in other countries and involves a sheepdog having to herd a flock of ewes into a fold. Identifying the best dogs for breeding is an important part to these competitions. A major Basque sheepdog trial event is held in Oñati in September.

In Spanish this is called  and in French .

See also

Basque people
Basque breeds and cultivars
Highland Games

References
Rural Basque Sports
The Basque Federation for Rural Sports
Kulki (a sports culture organisation)
Department of Culture (in Basque and Spanish)
Agirre, R. Juegos y deportes vascos, Auñamendi, Donostia 1978
Etxegoien, J. Orhipean, Xamar 1996
Feliu, C. Gure Herria: Tradiciones y Costumbres del País Vasco

External links

Documentary on Basque rural sports with English subtitles
EKE (in French, Basque and Spanish)
Napurra, a Basque sports organisation from the Northern Basque Country
Basque sports on Donquijote.org

Basque culture
Basque sport
Traditional sports